Omar Johnson is an American college baseball coach and former outfielder. Johnson is the head coach of the Jackson State Tigers baseball team.

Early life
Johnson was raised in Miami, Florida and attended Miami Senior High School.

Johnson attended the University of North Alabama, where he played for the North Alabama Lions baseball team as an outfielder.

Coaching career
Johnson served as an assistant for North Alabama before being named the head coach at Jackson State University in June 2006. Johnson coached the German national baseball team at the World Baseball Challenge in 2009.

Head coaching record

See also
 List of current NCAA Division I baseball coaches

References

External links

Living people
North Alabama Lions baseball players
North Alabama Lions baseball coaches
Jackson State Tigers baseball coaches
Year of birth missing (living people)
African-American baseball coaches
Sportspeople from Miami
Baseball coaches from Florida
Miami Senior High School alumni
National baseball team managers